Sanu Sharma is a Nepalese-born Australian novelist and short story writer. She has published six novels and one book of short story collection. Her book of short story collection Ekadeshmaa was nominated for the Madan Puraskar award in 2018.

Early life
Sanu Sharma was born in Prasuti Ghriha, a governmental maternity hospital in Kathmandu. She was brought up equally in Kathmandu and Terai in Nepal. Later, she moved to Australia and has been living there since then.

Career
Sharma published her first novel Ardhaviram in 2003 and Jeetko Paribhasha, the second one in 2010. She published her third novel Artha in 2011.

In 2017, Sharma published her fourth novel Biplavi; and she published her fifth book and first book of short story collection Ekadeshmaa in 2018. Ekadeshmaa drew attention of larger audience and acclaimed by more of her readers and critics. Subsequently, it was nominated for the Madan Puraskar, an award that is considered as the biggest literary award in Nepali literature.

After the success of Ekadeshmaa, Sharma published her fifth novel Utkarsha and sixth one Pharak in 2021 and 2022 respectively.

Works
Novels
 Ardhaviram 
 Jeetko Paribhasha
 Artha
 Biplavi 
 Utsharga 
 Pharak 

Short story collection
 Ekadeshmaa

References

External links 
 आँखा रसाउने उत्सर्ग, breaknlinks.com

Nepali-language writers
20th-century women writers
Australian women novelists
Nepalese novelists
Nepalese women novelists
Nepali-language writers from Australia
21st-century Nepalese women writers
Australian women essayists 
Australian people of Nepalese descent
Australian women nurses
Australian women short story writers
Australian women writers
Nepalese emigrants to Australia
Nepalese short story writers
Nepalese women short story writers
People from Kathmandu
People from Sydney
Writers from Sydney
Year of birth missing (living people)
Living people